Thomas Setodji (born 13 October 1995) is a French tennis player of Togolese descent.

Setodji has a career high ATP singles ranking of 820, achieved on 30 October 2017. He also has a career high ATP doubles ranking of 786, achieved on 7 January 2019. He has won one ITF doubles title.

Setodji represents Togo at the Davis Cup, where he has a W/L record of 5–1.

References

External links

1995 births
Living people
French male tennis players
Togolese male tennis players
People from Gonesse
French sportspeople of Togolese descent